Dimitri Delibes (born 17 March 1999) is a French rugby union player, who currently plays as a wing or a centre for Toulouse in the Top 14 and the Heineken Champions Cup.

Early life
Born in Toulouse, Dimitri Delibes started rugby for renowned local club Blagnac at the age of six, and then joined Toulouse academy in 2018.

Club career
Delibes made his professional debut with Toulouse on 1 November 2020 in a loss at Stade Français, during the 2020–21 Top 14 season.

He later won that season the 2020–21 European Rugby Champions Cup and the 2020–21 Bouclier de Brennus, having played five Top 14 games and one European game, at Munster in round of 16 on 3 April 2021.

International career
On 30 October 2022, Delibes was first called by Fabien Galthié to the France national team for the Autumn internationals.

Honours

Toulouse
 European Rugby Champions Cup: 2020–21
 Top 14: 2020–21

References

External links
 Stade Toulousain
 EPCR
 All.Rugby
 It's Rugby

1999 births
People from Toulouse
Living people
French rugby union players
Rugby union wings
Rugby union centres
Stade Toulousain players